Anaconda is a 1997 American adventure thriller film directed by Luis Llosa and starring Jennifer Lopez, Ice Cube, Jon Voight, Eric Stoltz, Jonathan Hyde and Owen Wilson. It focuses on a documentary film crew in the Amazon rainforest that is captured by a snake hunter who is hunting down a giant, legendary green anaconda. The film received mostly negative reviews but was a box office success, grossing $136.8 million worldwide against a $45 million budget, and also became a cult classic. It was followed by a series of films.

Plot
On the Amazon River, a poacher hides from an unknown creature in his boat. While it breaks through the boat and attempts to catch the poacher, he commits suicide by shooting himself to prevent it from killing him.

Meanwhile, a film crew is shooting a documentary about the Shirishamas, a long-lost indigenous Amazonian tribe. The crew includes director Terri Flores, cameraman and childhood friend Danny Rich, production manager Denise Kalberg, Denise's boyfriend and sound engineer Gary Dixon, narrator Warren Westridge, anthropologist Professor Steven Cale, and boat skipper Mateo. The group encounters stranded Paraguayan snake hunter Paul Serone, who convinces them he can help them find the Shirishamas. Most of the crew are uncomfortable around Serone, and Cale clashes with him several times about Shirishama lore. Eventually, Cale is stung by a wasp, and an allergic reaction swells up his throat and leaves him unconscious. Serone performs an emergency cricothyrotomy, seemingly saving Cale's life, but soon after, he takes over the boat, forcing the crew to help him achieve his true goal: hunting down a giant record-breaking green anaconda he had been tracking, which he believes that he can capture alive.

Danny, Mateo and Serone search the wreckage of the poacher's boat. A photograph in an old newspaper reveals that Mateo, Serone, and the poacher were working together to hunt animals, including snakes. Serone promises that if the crew helps him find the snake, he will help them get out alive. That night, the anaconda attacks the boat crew. Serone attempts to capture the snake, but it coils around Gary, crushing him. Terri attempts to shoot the anaconda to save him, but Serone knocks her gun away and the snake devours Gary, leaving Denise heartbroken in tears. The crew overpowers Serone and ties him up as punishment.

The next day, the boat becomes stuck at a waterfall, requiring Terri, Danny, and Westridge to enter the water to winch it loose. Denise confronts Serone and attempts to kill him to avenge Gary's death, but he strangles her with his legs before dumping her corpse into the river. The anaconda returns, and Westridge distracts it long enough for Terri and Danny to return to the boat while Westridge ascends the waterfall. Serone breaks free during the attack and attacks Danny. The anaconda climbs a tree and attacks Westridge, but the tree snaps. The crew winds up in the water, Cale wakes up in the process, and Westridge is killed in the fall from the waterfall. The snake attacks Danny, but Terri shoots it in the head. Serone, still believing he can capture the snake alive, attacks her. Cale stabs him with a tranquilizer dart before losing consciousness again himself, and Danny knocks Serone into the river.

Serone manages to catch up to the group and captures Terri and Danny, using them as bait in an attempt to capture a second, much larger female Queen anaconda, measuring  individual. The snake attacks the pair, slowly suffocating them. Serone attempts to catch the anaconda in a net, but it breaks free and attacks him, eventually swallowing him whole, while Terri and Danny watch as they escape their bonds. The anaconda gives chase to Terri, who retreats into the building and finds a nest full of newborn anacondas. The snake regurgitates the still-alive, but partially digested Serone and chases her up a smokestack. Danny pins its tail to the ground with a pickaxe and ignites a fire below the smoke shack, setting the snake on fire. The resulting explosion sends the burning anaconda flying out of the building and into the water. As Terri and Danny recuperate on a nearby dock, the anaconda resurfaces, but Danny kills it with an axe to the head.

Afterward, Terri and Danny reunite with Cale, who begins to revive on the boat. While floating downriver, the trio suddenly locates the Shirishama tribe, who helps them escape the Amazon.

Cast
Jennifer Lopez as Terri Flores
Ice Cube as Danny Rich
Jon Voight as Paul Serone
Eric Stoltz as Dr. Steven Cale
Jonathan Hyde as Warren Westridge
Owen Wilson as Gary Dixon
Kari Wuhrer as Denise Kalberg
Vincent Castellanos as Mateo
Danny Trejo as Poacher

Soundtrack

Randy Edelman composed and conducted the film's soundtrack, released by Edel America Records.

 Track listing
 Main Title (4:45)
 Watching and Waiting (4:43)
 Night Attack (2:47)
 This Must Be Heaven (1:39)
 Down River (2:43)
 Seduction (3:27)
 Travelogue (2:45)
 Baiting the Line (2:47)
 My Beautiful Anna... (conda) (2:54)
 The Totem's Scared Ground (2:26)
 Sarone's Last Stand (3:00)

Reception

Box office
The film opened at No. 1 with $16.6 million in its first weekend and remained at the top spot in its following week. In total, Anaconda went on to gross $136.8 million worldwide, making it a sizable box office success collecting more than three times its $45 million budget.

Critical response
Anaconda received generally negative reviews upon its release. Some critics did praise the film's effects, scenery, and tongue-in-cheek humor, but many criticized the acting, "forgettable" or "cardboard" characters, inaccuracies, and "boring" start. On Rotten Tomatoes, the film holds a rating of 40%, based on 53 reviews, with an average rating of 4.9/10. The site's consensus reads: "Anacondas pulpy pleasures are constricted by its own absurdity, but creature feature fans may enjoy its brazen silliness". On Metacritic, the film has a score of 37 out of 100, based on 20 critics, indicating "generally unfavorable reviews". Audiences polled by CinemaScore gave the film an average grade of "B−" on an A+ to F scale.

Film critic Leonard Maltin awarded the film a mixed 2 out of a possible 4 stars, criticizing the film's "hokey" special effects and "expositionless" script but complimented the film's use of Brazilian locale and Voight's campy performance. Roger Ebert awarded the film 3 1/2 out of 4 stars and called it a "...slick, scary, funny Creature Feature, beautifully photographed and splendidly acted in high adventure style".

Despite the initial negative reception, Anaconda has since become a cult classic, often viewed as being so-bad-it's-good. The film is listed in Golden Raspberry Award founder John Wilson's book The Official Razzie Movie Guide as one of The 100 Most Enjoyably Bad Movies Ever Made.

Accolades
The film was nominated for six Razzie Awards in 1998 including Worst Picture (which lost to The Postman), Worst Actor (Jon Voight; which went to Kevin Costner for The Postman), Worst Director (awarded to Costner for The Postman), Worst Screenplay (lost to The Postman), Worst New Star ("the animatronic anaconda"; which went to Dennis Rodman for Double Team) and Worst Screen Couple (Voight and "the animatronic anaconda"; where they lost to Rodman and Jean-Claude Van Damme for Double Team). It was also nominated for two Saturn Awards including Best Actress (Jennifer Lopez; who lost to Jodie Foster for Contact) and Best Horror Film (which went to The Devil's Advocate). It won two Stinkers Awards including Worst Supporting Actor and Worst Fake Accent for Jon Voight (who also won the latter award for Most Wanted).

Legacy
The broadcast of the movie during primetime viewing on South African television station e.tv has become a national running gag, with the station airing the movie several times every year since the mid-2000s.

Sequels and crossover

A sequel, Anacondas: The Hunt for the Blood Orchid, was released to theaters in 2004. Three more films follows with a direct-to-video release, Anaconda 3: Offspring (2008), Anacondas: Trail of Blood (2009) and Lake Placid vs. Anaconda (2015), a crossover film with the Lake Placid franchise.

Even though no characters from the first film appear in the sequels, the events of the first film are referenced by the character Cole Burris in the second film, when he says he knows a man (Dr. Steven Cale) and another man (Danny Rich) that took a crew down to the Amazon, where they were attacked by snakes; in Lake Placid vs. Anaconda, character Will "Tully" Tull describes the same incident of the snakes in the Amazon to Reba, without explicitly mentioning the characters.

Reboot
In January 2020, Sony Pictures announced a reboot is in development and screenwriter Evan Daugherty was hired to write the reboot film.

See also
List of killer snake films

References

External links

1997 films
1997 horror films
1990s monster movies
1990s horror thriller films
American monster movies
American natural horror films
American horror thriller films
Brazilian thriller films
Films about hunters
Films about snakes
Films directed by Luis Llosa
Films set in Brazil
Films set in South America
Films set in the Amazon
Films set in jungles
Films set on boats
Films shot in Amazonas (Brazilian state)
Films scored by Randy Edelman
1990s English-language films
Portuguese-language films
1990s Spanish-language films
Giant monster films
Anaconda (film series)
Columbia Pictures films
1990s American films